The primary regulator of telecommunications in Malaysia is the Malaysian Communications and Multimedia Commission (MCMC). It issues licenses under the Communications and Multimedia Act 1998, the Postal Services Act 2012 and the Digital Signature Act 1997.

History

The British, who had a presence in Malaysia from the 18th century, were responsible for setting up the country's earliest telecommunications facilities, which over time evolved into TM. First establishing telegraph lines under the Posts & Telegraphs Department, telephones made their debut in the late 19th century, the earliest hand-cranked Magneto operated devices being used in Perak in the 1880s. The first public telephone exchange in the country was also set up in Ipoh, in 1902.

In 1891, telephones made its debut in Kuala Lumpur. At the turn of the century, a major telephony line from Province Wellesley (Seberang Prai) in Penang to Johor Bahru was built, and in 1915 the first underground cable was laid linking Ipoh, Taiping, Kampar and Teluk Anson.

Along with increased trade and the development of townships, the number of telephone subscribers in Peninsular Malaysia increased significantly. By 1930, to deal with the volume of telephony traffic, an automated magneto exchange was commissioned in Kuala Lumpur on Jalan Weld. In the 1930s, all telephone exchanges in the Malayan Trunk System could communicate with exchanges in Java, the Philippines, the United States, Canada and Mexico using shortwave radio-telephone transmitters. Towards the end of the decade, a Marconi Radio Terminal was installed at the Kuala Lumpur Telephone Exchange to handle overseas calls.

Much of this telecommunications infrastructure was damaged during the Second World War and the Japanese occupation. In 1946, when the British re-established their position in Malaya, they repaired the trunk routes, restored fallen telephone poles and installed the copper wires that had either been damaged or stolen. During the Japanese occupation, the Posts & Telegraphs Department had been split into two separate units. When the British returned, they initially re-united the two entities, but this effort was short-lived. Along with the formation of the Malayan Union on 1 April 1946, the Malaysian Telecommunications Department and the Postal Services Department were born, with the former controlling telegraph, telephone and wireless services and the latter overlooking mail, money orders and savings accounts.

Telephones system 
Number of fixed-telephone subscriptions: 6.474 million as at 4Q 2019

Number of Direct Exchange Line (DEL) subscriptions: 2.199 million as at 4Q 2019

Telephone system

Domestic:

 Communication connectivity in Peninsular Malaysia is covered by both fixed and wireless infrastructure such as fibre network, Asymmetric Digital Subscriber Line (ADSL) network, mobile base stations, earth stations and microwave link stations
 Communication connectivity in East Malaysia mainly provided by the coverage of fibre network, ADSL network, earth stations, mobile base station and microwave link stations
 Intercity communication service (backhaul) provided in Peninsular and East Malaysia is mainly by fibre optic connections and fixed wireless systems (microwave links). In addition, there are also deployment of Very Small Aperture Terminal (VSAT) for service provisioning in rural areas
 Major telecommunication operators in Malaysia include Celcom, Digi, Maxis, U Mobile, Telekom Malaysia and Time dotCom

International:

 Connectivity via submarine cables to Tier 1 networks that can reach every other network on the Internet solely via settlement-free interconnection
 Major submarine cable providers in Malaysia are Telekom Malaysia and Time dotCom
 Satellite services coverage to most world continents by MEASAT, the Malaysian satellite service provider

Broadband
Total broadband subscriptions are at 43.378 million as at 4Q 2019, with broadband penetration rate per 100 inhabitants standing at 131.7%.

Fixed broadband development 
In 2019, fixed broadband contributed 6.79% of total broadband market share or 2.947 million subscriptions (2018: 2.7 million).

Fixed broadband is being provided via Asymmetrical Digital Subscriber Line (ADSL), Symmetric Digital Subscriber Line (SDSL), Very-high bit-rate Digital Subscriber Line (VDSL), Fibre-to-the-Home (FTTH), Satellite, Fixed Wireless Access (FWA) and Evolution-Data Optimized (EVDO).

The High Speed Broadband project known as HSBB was introduced since 2008 to improve the quality of broadband access and enable the users in major cities and high-impact economies areas to enjoy broadband speeds up to 100Mbps; The Suburban Broadband (SUBB) and Rural Broadband (RBB) provide broadband speeds up to 20Mbps for users in suburban and rural areas.

On 28 August 2019, the Government approved the implementation of the National Fiberisation and Connectivity Plan (NFCP) over a five-year period from 2019 to 2023.

NFCP is a plan that aims to put in place a robust, pervasive, high quality and affordable digital connectivity for the well-being of the people and progress of the country with the following targets:

1. Entry-level fixed broadband package at 1% of GNI by 2020

2. Gigabits availability in selected industrial areas by 2020 and to all State Capitals by 2023

3. 100% availability for premises in State Capitals and selected high impact areas with a minimum speed of 500Mbps by 2021

4. 20% availability for premises in sub-urban and rural areas with up to 500Mbps by 2022

5. Fibre network passes 70% of schools, hospitals, libraries, police stations and post offices by 2022

6. Average speed of 30Mbps in 98% of populated areas by 2023

7. Improve mobile coverage along Pan Borneo highway upon completion

Further information on NFCP can be obtained from NFCP Home Page.

Mobile broadband development 
In 2019, mobile broadband contributed 93.21% of total broadband market share or 40.431 million of subscriptions as at 4Q 2019 (2018: 36.8 million).

Upgrading and expansion of network coverage
The Time 3 and Time 3 Extension initiatives involved construction of 1,833 new communications towers in rural areas nationwide. Apart from that, a total of 4,895 base stations at existing communications towers were upgraded from 2G to 3G/4G to cater higher broadband speed in rural areas.

Submarine Cable System to Sabah & Sarawak
Introduced in 2014 through a public-private partnership between MCMC and Telekom Malaysia Berhad (TM). The project was completed in 2017 and this will be a redundancy to the existing domestic submarine cable services that have been operating since 1995. It was aimed to meet the growing demands for bandwidth between Peninsular Malaysia and East Malaysia.

Submarine Cable System to Islands
The project started in 2017 and was completed in 2018, which involved in upgrading of existing communications infrastructure network, together with the submarine cables connecting between the mainland with three islands - Perhentian, Tioman and Pangkor islands.

Broadband service providers

Mobile Cellular 
The major service providers for mobile cellular services in Malaysia are  Celcom Axiata Berhad,  Digi Telecommunications Sdn Bhd, Maxis Berhad and  U Mobile Sdn Bhd. The number of mobile cellular subscriptions stood at 44.601 million as at 4Q 2019 with penetration rate per 100 inhabitants is 135.4%.

Mobile cellular service is also provided by Mobile Virtual Network Operator (MVNO). As at 4Q 2019, there are 10 MVNOs operating in Malaysia which include  Merchantrade Asia Sdn Bhd, redONE Network Sdn Bhd,  Tune Talk Sdn Bhd,  XOX Com Berhad, Altel Communication Sdn Bhd, Telekomunikasi Indonesia International (M) Sdn Bhd, Cubic Telecom, Pavo Communications Sdn Bhd, MY Evolution Sdn Bhd and Redtone Engineering & Network Services Sdn Bhd.

Radio Usage Statistics

Radio broadcast assignment 

 Shortwave (HF): 14 assignments
 FM: 707 assignments

Radio broadcast stations FM 

 Public Radio Stations: 33
 Private Radio Stations: 27

List of Terrestrial Radio Channels 

A. Radio Televisyen Malaysia (Federal government-operated channels)
1. Nasional FM

2. Traxx FM

3. Minnal FM

4. Ai FM

5. Radio Klasik FM

6. Asyik FM

7. Local/State Radio Stations: 27

7.1 Perlis FM

7.2 Kedah FM

7.3 Mutiara FM

7.4 Perak FM

7.5 Selangor FM

7.6 Negeri FM

7.7 Malacca FM

7.8 Johor FM

7.9 Pahang FM

7.10 Terengganu FM

7.11 Kelantan FM

7.12 Sarawak FM

7.13 Sabah FM

7.14 KL FM

7.15 Limbang FM

7.16 Miri FM

7.17 Sri Aman FM

7.18 Bintulu FM

7.19 Sibu FM

7.20 Red FM- Sarawak Rangkaian Merah

7.21 WAI FM- Sarawak Saluran Etnik

7.22 Sandakan FM

7.23 Tawau FM

7.24 Keningau FM

7.25 Labuan FM

7.26 Langkawi FM

B. Media Prima Berhad (Private)
1. Synchrosound Studio Sdn Bhd (Hot FM)

2. One FM Radio Sdn Bhd (One FM)

3. Kool FM Radio Sdn Bhd (Kool FM)

C. Measat Broadcast Network Services Sdn Bhd (ASTRO) (Private)
1. Capital FM Sdn Bhd (Go Xuan & Zayan)

2. Measat Radio Communications Sdn Bhd (Hitz FM, Lite FM & MY FM)

3. Maestra Broadcast Sdn Bhd (ERA FM, Mix FM & Melody FM)

4. Perfect Excellence Waves Sdn Bhd (Sinar FM)

5. Radio Lebuhraya Sdn Bhd (Raaga & Gegar)

D. Star Media Group Berhad (The Star) (Private)
1. Rimakmur Sdn Bhd (Suria FM)

2. Star Rfm Sdn Bhd (988 FM)

E. Others
1. BFM Media Sdn Bhd (BFM 89.9)

2. Husa Network Sdn Bhd (Manis FM)

3. Senandung Sonik Sdn Bhd (TEA FM)

4. Radio Kita Sdn Bhd ( RAKITA)

5. Cense Media Sdn Bhd (Kupi-Kupi FM & City Plus FM)

6. Suara Johor Sdn Bhd ( Best FM)

7. Kristal Harta Sdn Bhd (Cats FM)

8. Institut Kefahaman Islam Malaysia (IKIM FM)

9. Malaysia Airports (Sepang) Sdn Bhd (Fly FM)

10. Arus Rentas Sdn Bhd (KK12FM)

11. Ephrata Services Sdn Bhd (VOKfm)

Amateur Radio Stations: 13,682 assignments

Radio listenership: 19.8 million (2018)

Television

Analogue Terrestrial Television (ATT) broadcast assignment 
 252 assignments (until 31 Dec 2019)

Digital Terrestrial Television (DTT) broadcast assignment 
 88 assignments

Digital terrestrial television stations 
The following channels are free-to-air:

A. Under Radio Televisyen Malaysia (Federal government-operated channels)
1. TV1

2. TV2

3. Sukan RTM

4. Berita RTM

5. TV Okey

6. TV6

B. Under Media Prima Berhad (Private)
1. Sistem Televisyen Malaysia Berhad (TV3)

2. Natseven TV Sdn Bhd (NTV7)

3. Metropolitan TV Sdn Bhd (8TV)

4. CH-9 Media Sdn Bhd (TV9)

5. CJ Wow Shop (operated by TV3)

6. Drama Sangat (operated by TV3)

C. Alhijrah Media Corporation (JAKIM-operated channel)
1. TV Alhijrah

D. Pertubuhan Berita Nasional Malaysia (BERNAMA) (Government news agency)
1. Bernama TV

Hotel-only in-house video channel 
1. Vision Four Multimedia Sdn Bhd (Vision Four)

Subscription broadcasting providers 

Cable-based
1. Asian Broadcasting Network (M) Sdn Bhd (ABNXcess) (Defunct)

Satellite-based
1. Measat Broadcast Network Systems Sdn Bhd (Astro)

IP over UHF-based transmission-based
1. U Television Sdn Bhd (MiTV) (Defunct)

IPTV-based
1. Fine TV Network Sdn Bhd (Fine TV) (Defunct)

2. eTV Multimedia Sdn Bhd (DETV) (Defunct)

3. TM Net Sdn Bhd (Unifi TV)

Television viewership: 28 million (2017)

Internet 
Internet Users: 28.304 million (2018)2

Country code (Top level domain): MY

See also 
 History of Communications in Malaysia
 Internet in Malaysia
 Malaysian telephone codes
 Malaysian mobile phone codes
 Media of Malaysia

Notes 
1 Network that can reach every other network on the Internet without purchasing IP transit or paying for peering

2 Internet user population is calculated from Internet Users Survey 2018 (IUS 2018) based on 87.4% of total population of Malaysia in 2018 (32.385 mil). Population data from Department of Statistics Malaysia (DoSM).

References 

 
Communications in Malaysia
Malaysia
Malaysia